Alexandra Chekina (born 10 February 1993) is a track and road cyclist from Russia.

Career

Road cycling
She participated at the 2012 UCI Road World Championships. As an under-23 rider she participated at the 2014 European Road Championships, finishing  9th in the Women's under-23 road race.

Track cycling
After winning the bronze medal on the track in 2013 in the team pursuit at the 2013 UEC European Track Championships, she won the silver medal in the team pursuit at the 2015 UEC European Track Championships in Grenchen, Switzerland.

Career results
2012
3rd  Individual Pursuit, UEC European U23 Track Championships
2013
1st  Team pursuit, UEC European U23 Track Championships (with Gulnaz Badykova, Maria Mishina and Svetlana Kashirina)
2014
UEC European U23 Track Championships
1st  Team pursuit (with Tamara Balabolina, Alexandra Goncharova and Gulnaz Badykova)
3rd  Points Race
2nd  Team pursuit, UEC European Track Championships (with Tamara Balabolina, Irina Molicheva, Aleksandra Goncharova and Evgenia Romanyuta)
2015
2nd  Team Pursuit, UEC European Track Championships (with Gulnaz Badykova, Tamara Balabolina and Maria Savitskaya)
3rd  Team Pursuit, UEC European U23 Track Championships (with Gulnaz Badykova, Tamara Balabolina and Natalia Mozharova)

References

External links
 profile at Procyclingstats.com

1993 births
Russian female cyclists
Living people
Place of birth missing (living people)
Russian track cyclists